There are two places in New Zealand called Normanby:

Normanby, Otago is a suburb of Dunedin
Normanby, Taranaki is a town in the western North Island

There is a Normanby a few Kilometres south of Timaru